The 1948 Fresno State Bulldogs football team  represented Fresno State Normal School—now known as California State University, Fresno—during the 1948 college football season. Fresno State competed in the California Collegiate Athletic Association (CCAA). The team was led by second-year head coach Ken Gleason and played home games at Ratcliffe Stadium on the campus of Fresno City College in Fresno, California. They finished the season with a record of three wins, six losses and one tie (3–6–1, 2–3 CCAA). The Bulldogs were outscored 108–267 for the season.

Schedule

References

Fresno State
Fresno State Bulldogs football seasons
Fresno State Bulldogs football